Mark Maxwell, aka SILAS, is an American songwriter, record producer, and film composer based in Los Angeles. He is best known for his work with Afrojack, Lindsey Stirling, 3OH!3, the Millionaires (band), and Itch.

Maxwell co-wrote and produced seven songs for Lindsey Stirling's sophomore album Shatter Me, which won the 2015 Billboard Music Award for Top Dance/Electronic Album.

Maxwell also composed the original score for the 2016 comedy film Brother Nature. Scoring credits also include the theme music for MTV's Real World: Ex-Plosion.

Discography

Remixes

References

Living people
Record producers from Oklahoma
Songwriters from Oklahoma
People from Edmond, Oklahoma
Year of birth missing (living people)